1987 World Masters Athletics Championships is the seventh in a series of World Masters Athletics Outdoor Championships (called World Veterans Games or World Masters Games at the time) that took place in Melbourne, Australia, from 28 November to 6 December 1987. The 4,000+ participating athletes made this the largest track and field meet in the world.

The main venue was Olympic Park Stadium, which had hosted the 1956 Summer Olympics. A World Games Promotional Track and Field Meet was held at Olympic Park Stadium on 7 December, 1986 as a warm-up publicity showcase.

The stadium was later demolished in 2011 and replaced by Olympic Park Oval. Throwing events were held in Gosch's Paddock next to the tracks.

Cross Country was held at Royal Park. The marathon course included Port Melbourne, South Melbourne, St Kilda and Elwood, with start and finish at Olympic Park Stadium. 

The three-time Olympian Raelene Boyle carried a friendship torch into the stadium to light an Olympic-style flame during opening ceremonies on Sunday, 29 November.

This edition of masters athletics Championships had a minimum age limit of 35 years for women and 40 years for men.

The governing body of this series is World Association of Veteran Athletes (WAVA). WAVA was formed during meeting at the inaugural edition of this series at Toronto in 1975, then officially founded during the second edition in 1977, then renamed as World Masters Athletics (WMA) at the Brisbane Championships in 2001.

This Championships was organized by WAVA in coordination with a Local Organising Committee (LOC) of Peg Smith, Ray Callaghan.

In addition to a full range of track and field events,

non-stadia events included 10K Cross Country, 10K Race Walk (women), 20K Race Walk (men), and Marathon.
After an experimental suspension of the relays in 1983

and forming regional relay teams in 1985,

relays reverted to national teams for this Championships.

Controversy
After 1976, when the International Amateur Athletic Federation (IAAF) expelled the Amateur Athletic Union of South Africa over the apartheid policy of the South African government,

the participation of South African athletes in WAVA competitions had been at odds with the IAAF, specifically due to the 1977 WAVA constitution which had stated that

As a compromise, South Africans often competed under the flag of other nations in previous editions of these Championships.

During General Assembly at this Championships, WAVA delegates approved a motion to amend the WAVA constitution and exclude countries whose national federation is suspended by the IAAF.

Thus South African athletes were now officially banned from these Championships, and would not be welcomed back until the 1993 edition in Miyazaki,

after the abolition of apartheid and the readmittance of South Africa into IAAF in 1992.

Results
Past Championships results are archived at WMA.

Additional archives are available from Museum of Masters Track & Field

as a pdf book,

as a searchable pdf,

and in a pdf newsletter.

Several masters world records were set at this Championships. World records for 1987 are from the list of World Records in the Museum of Masters Track & Field searchable pdf unless otherwise noted.

After the relays on the last day of competition (Sunday, 6 December), the 3 medalists from each of the 1500m races were invited to participate in a special "Masters Mile", where 4 world records were broken.

Key:

Women

Men

References

World Masters Athletics Championships
World Masters Athletics Championships
International athletics competitions hosted by Australia
1987
Masters athletics (track and field) records